The Governor of the North Eastern Province, Sri Lanka ( Uthuru saha Nægenahira palāth āndukāravarayā) was responsible for the management of the North Eastern Provincial Council, its key functions including exercising powers vested in the Governor by the Provincial Council Act No. 42 of 1987 amended by Act No. 28 of 1990 and the 13th Amendment to the Constitution. The position was abolished in December 2006 with the demerger of the Northern and Eastern Provinces.

Governors

See also
 List of Chief Ministers of Sri Lanka

References

North Eastern